The Jump began airing its first series live on Channel 4 from 26 January 2014 for 8 non-consecutive nights ending on 3 February 2014. The series was presented by Davina McCall and Alex Brooker. The celebrities were trained by Amy Williams and Graham Bell, with Eddie "The Eagle" Edwards mentoring them.

Contestants
The twelve original celebrities taking part were revealed on 11 December 2013.

Two of the original line-up withdrew from the show before it began: it was announced on 13 January 2014 that socialite Tara Palmer-Tomkinson had quit the show and been replaced by Laura Hamilton, while actor Sam J. Jones withdrew the following day due to a shoulder injury, to be replaced by Ritchie Neville.

When the series began, it was revealed that Joe McElderry and Donal MacIntyre were also training as standby competitors. When Henry Conway withdrew from the competition on 28 January 2014 following a hand injury, a live ski jump-off was contested between McElderry and MacIntyre, with McElderry winning and thus taking Conway's place. However, MacIntyre joined the following day, when Melinda Messenger was forced to withdraw due to concussion. On 3 February 2014, prior to the evening's final, Sir Steve Redgrave and Marcus Brigstocke were forced to withdraw due to injuries they suffered during training.

Live shows
The series began airing on 26 January 2014 for eight days, there was no show on 1 February, until the final on 3 February 2014. During the live ski jump, the celebrities are given the option of three jumps – K15 (small), K24 (medium) or K40 with the largest. The celebrity that jumps the shortest distance is eliminated. From Day 5 onwards the K15 jump was removed from the competition.

Results summary
Colour key

 Due to Conway pulling out due to injury, McElderry joined the competition after winning a live ski-jump against Donal MacIntyre on Day 3.
 Due to Messenger's pulling out, McIntyre joined the competition on Day 4.
 There was no episode on 1 February.

Episode details

Episode 1 (26 January)
Event: Men's Giant slalom
Location: Kühtai

Live ski jump details

Episode 2 (27 January)
Event: Women's Skeleton
Location: Igls sliding centre

Live ski jump details

Episode 3 (28 January)
Event: Men's Skeleton
Location: Igls sliding centre

At the beginning of the show it was revealed that Conway had to pull out of the competition due to injury during training for the Skeleton. It was then revealed that Joe McElderry and Donal MacIntyre had been training as standbys, and that one of them would join the competition to replace Conway. They both had to complete a live ski-jump, with the celebrity jumping the furthest joining the competition. They both jumped from the K24, with McElderry jumping 15.0 meters and MacIntyre jumping 11.5 meters meaning that McElderry joined the competition to replace Conway.

Live ski jump details

Episode 4 (29 January)
Event: Women's Giant slalom
Location: Kühtai
At the start of the show it was announced that Messenger had to pull out due to concussion during training for the Bobsleigh event. She was replaced by Donal MacIntyre who initially lost out to McElderry in the ski-jump on Day 3.

Live ski jump details

Episode 5 (30 January)
Event: Bobsleigh
Location: Igls sliding centre

From this point onwards the K15 jump was removed from the competition. Although Redgrave took part in the event, he was not present during the live show following an accident which happened after the event took place.

Live ski jump details

Episode 6 (31 January)
Event: Speed skating
Location: OlympiaWorld Innsbruck (outdoor rink)

Live ski jump details

Episode 7: Semi-final (2 February)
Event 1: Speed skiing and Slalom
Location: Kühtai

Live ski jump details

Episode 8: Final (3 February)
Events: Ski cross
Location: Kühtai

Live ski jump details

Ratings
Official ratings are taken from BARB, but do not include Channel 4 +1.

References

2014 in British television